Tushingham Hall is a country house in Tushingham, Cheshire, England.  Formerly a moated farmhouse, it was remodelled in the early 19th century for Daniel Vawdrey, retaining many 17th-century features.  It is constructed in rendered brick with slate roofs.  Its architectural style is Tudor Revival.  The house is in two storeys with a symmetrical entrance front.  The centre of the front is recessed and contains a canted open porch with three Tudor arches.  Above this is a mullioned window containing two sashes.  On each side is a similar window in both storeys, those in the upper storey being smaller than those below.  Above the window over the porch is a shaped gable containing a wreath, and the rest of the front is crenellated.  The interior contains a 17th-century staircase originally in Dearnford Hall, Staffordshire.  The house is recorded in the National Heritage List for England as a designated Grade II listed building.

See also

Listed buildings in Tushingham cum Grindley

References

Country houses in Cheshire
Houses completed in the 17th century
Tudor Revival architecture in England
Grade II listed buildings in Cheshire
Grade II listed houses